Courtenay Taylor is an American actress. She is best known for her video game voice roles as Jack in the Mass Effect series, Ada Wong in the Resident Evil series, and the female Sole Survivor in Fallout 4.

Career
Taylor has been named as one of the most prolific voice actors in the gaming industry, having been working in the genre since 2002 with American Idol. In 2010, she voiced Gloria Van Graff, Janet, Jas Wilkins, Morgan Blake, and other additional characters in Fallout: New Vegas. In 2015, she returned to the Fallout series to voice the female Sole Survivor in Fallout 4. As of 2017, she has worked on 83 separate titles in numerous franchises.

Personal life
Taylor revealed in 2017 that she had suffered from a vocal cord hemorrhage after working on a game during a speech that included whispering, and was unable to work for three months afterwards.

Filmography

Voice over roles

Film

Television

Video games

Live action roles

Film

Television

References

External links
 

20th-century American actresses
21st-century American actresses
American film actresses
American television actresses
American video game actresses
American voice actresses
Living people
Year of birth missing (living people)